Artemio Gualberto Villanueva Paolisso (9 November 1945 – 2 August 2010) was a Paraguayan footballer. He played in 15 matches for the Paraguay national football team from 1966 to 1971. He was also part of Paraguay's squad for the 1967 South American Championship.

References

External links
 

1945 births
2010 deaths
Paraguayan footballers
Paraguay international footballers
Place of birth missing
Association football goalkeepers
Cerro Porteño players